The Durușca is a left tributary of the river Bahlui in Romania. It flows into the Bahlui in Sprânceana.

References

Rivers of Romania
Rivers of Iași County